Roxburgh, Selkirk and Peebles was a county constituency of the House of Commons of the Parliament of the United Kingdom (Westminster) from 1955 to 1983. It elected one Member of Parliament (MP) by the first past the post voting system.

Boundaries 

The constituency was first defined by the First Periodical Review of the Boundary Commission, and first used in the 1955 general election, to cover the counties of Roxburgh, Selkirk and Peebles.

The counties of Roxburgh and Selkirk were previously covered by the Roxburgh and Selkirk constituency, and the county of Peebles was previously covered by the Midlothian and Peebles constituency.

The boundaries of the Roxburgh, Selkirk and Peebles constituency were unaltered when the results of the Second Periodical Review were implemented for the February 1974 general election.

In 1975, Scottish counties were abolished under the Local Government (Scotland) Act 1973.

The Third Periodical Review took account of new local government boundaries, and results were implemented for the 1983 general election. The Roxburgh, Selkirk and Peebles constituency was abolished. The Roxburgh and Berwickshire constituency, related to the Roxburgh and Berwickshire districts of the Borders region, and the Tweeddale, Ettrick and Lauderdale constituency, related to the Tweeddale and Ettrick and Lauderdale districts of the same region, were created. The Tweedale district had been created with the boundaries of the former county of Peebles.

Members of Parliament

Election results

Elections in the 1950s

Elections in the 1960s

Elections in the 1970s

References

See also 
1965 Roxburgh, Selkirk and Peebles by-election

Historic parliamentary constituencies in Scotland (Westminster)
Peeblesshire
Selkirkshire
Constituencies of the Parliament of the United Kingdom established in 1955
Constituencies of the Parliament of the United Kingdom disestablished in 1983